Wequaquet Lake is a  unstratified warmwater lake in Barnstable County, Massachusetts. It is located northwest of Hyannis. Wequaquet Lake drains south via Centerville River which flows into the Atlantic Ocean. Wequaquet Lake is also known as Chequaquet Lake, Great Pond or Nine Mile Pond. The bottom is composed primarily of sand. The 7.5 miles of shoreline is heavily (90%) developed with cottages and year-round homes. Bearse Pond is connected to Wequaquet Lake by a narrow channel, other nearby ponds include Hathaways Pond and Shallow Pond.

Fishing
Fish species present in the lake are pumpkinseed, yellow perch, golden shiner, brown bullhead, American eel, alewife, white sucker, banded killifish, chain pickerel and largemouth bass. The alewife and blueback herring populations are sea-run, entering via the Centerville River.

Locations
Fuller Point
Lewis Point
Hayes Point
Great Point
Little Point
Long Point
Gooseberry Island
Huckins Neck
Nyes Point
Nyes Neck
Stoney Point
Point Shirley

References 

Lakes of Massachusetts
Lakes of Barnstable County, Massachusetts